Hrabová is a municipal district of the city of Ostrava, Czech Republic. It is located on the south side of the city. Hrabová is ranked 10th out of 23 districts by population. The Ostravice river flows through the district. The district has a primary school, nursery schools, medical facilities, a post office and the municipal police.

References

Ostrava
Neighbourhoods in the Czech Republic